Kristian Kjøndal (born 1985 in Larvik, Norway) is a Norwegian poker player, who came in fourth in the season 3 EPT grand final. He is also an internet player known as "Kris85" on the Prima Poker network or "Pokerkong1" on Full Tilt Poker. Kjøndal is a high-stakes internet poker player, often playing in $40,000NL games.

As of 2008, his total live tournament winnings exceed $1,000,000.

References

External links 
 profile at europeanpokertour.com
 Bio at pokeronamac.com

Norwegian poker players
1985 births
Living people
People from Larvik